Namma Kuzhandaigal is a 1970 Indian Tamil-language children's film directed by Srikanth and produced by D. Ramanaidu. It is based on writer Poovannan's novel Aalam Vizhudhu. The film stars Major Sundarrajan, Pandari Bai and Vennira Aadai Nirmala. It was released on 27 February 1970, and won three Tamil Nadu State Film Awards: Third Best Film, Best Female Playback Singer for S. Janaki, and Best Story Writer for Poovannan.

Plot

Cast 
 Major Sundarrajan
 Pandari Bai
 Vennira Aadai Nirmala
 Master Sridhar, 
 S. N. Surendar 
 Prabhakar
 Master Sekhar, 
 Roja Ramani 
 Leela Jayalakshmi

Production 
Namma Kuzhandaigal is based on writer Poovannan's novel Aalam Vizhudhu. It was directed by Srikanth and produced by D. Ramanaidu under Vijaya & Suresh Combines, while the dialogues were written by Thuraiyur K. Murthi.

Soundtrack 
The soundtrack was composed by M. S. Viswanathan, while the lyrics were written by Kannadasan.

Release and reception 
Namma Kuzhandaigal was released on 27 February 1970. The Indian Express said the following day, "To inculcate values prudence, simplicity and honesty in children the movie has meandered into three tracts. Even so the first half of the film is very gripping. In the second half there are many unnecessary incidents and characters not related to the children's film. If one can ignore these it is recommendable film. The attempt is laudable." At the Tamil Nadu State Film Awards, the film won the following awards: Best Story Writer for Poovannan, Third Best Film, and Best Female Playback Singer for S. Janaki.

References

External links 

1970s children's drama films
1970s Tamil-language films
Films based on Indian novels
Films scored by M. S. Viswanathan
Indian children's drama films